No. 344 Squadron was a Free French land based anti-submarine squadron given a Royal Air Force squadron number during World War II.

History
The squadron was formed at Dakar, Senegal, on 29 November 1943 from Flotille 1E and equipped with British Wellington aircraft. It was under RAF control until 27 November 1945 when it disbanded upon reversion to French control.

Aircraft operated

References

External links
 History of No.'s 310–347 Squadrons at RAF Web
 343 & 344 Squadron histories on the official RAF website

Military units and formations established in 1943

Military units and formations disestablished in 1945
344 Squadron